Shestovo is a rural locality (a village) in Plesetsky District, Arkhangelsk Oblast, Russia. The population was 31 as of 2010.

Geography 
Shestovo is located 37 km north of Plesetsk (the district's administrative centre) by road. Savinsky is the nearest rural locality.

References 

Rural localities in Plesetsky District